Events from the year 1936 in Denmark.

Incumbents
 Monarch – Christian X
 Prime minister – Thorvald Stauning

Events
 1–16 August – Denmark participates in the 1936 Summer Olympics and wins five medals.
 22 September – The 1936 Landsting elections are held.

Undated
 The political party Danish Unity is established.
 The Viborg Handball Club is established.

Sports

Cycling
 Albert Billiet (BEL) and Werner Grundahl Hansen (DEN) win the Six Days of Copenhagen sox-day track cycling race.
  Jan Pijnenburg (NED) and Frans Slaats (NED) and win the Six Days of Copenhagen sox-day track cycling race.

Football
 Grem wins their fourth Danish football championship by winning the 1935–36 Danish Championship League.

Births
 13 March – Finn Kobberø, badminton player (d. 2009)
 28 April – John Tchicai, jazz musician and composer (d. 2012)
 30 June – Flemming Flindt, ballet dancer and choreographer (d. 2009)
 17 September – Jan Gehl, architect, urban planner
 1 November – Mimi Heinrich, actress and writer (d. 2017)
 30 November – Knud Enemark Jensen, racing cyclist (d. 1960)

Deaths
 22 January – Louis Glass, composer (b. 1864)
 22 February – Johan Skjoldborg, novelist, playwright and memoirist (b. 1861)
 23 April – Thomas Bærentzen, sculptor (b. 1869)
 3 August – Carl William Hansen, author, Luciferian, wandering bishop and occultist (b. 1872)
 9 October – Carl Peter Hermann Christensen, Denmark's last executioner (b. 1869)
 22 October  Hedevig Quiding, singer and music critic (b. 1867)
 24 November – J. A. D. Jensen, naval officer and Arctic explorer (b. 1849)

References

 
Denmark
Years of the 20th century in Denmark
1930s in Denmark
1936 in Europe